Lotto 6/49 is one of three national lottery games in Canada. Launched on June 12, 1982, Lotto 6/49 was the first nationwide Canadian lottery game to allow players to choose their own numbers. Previous national games, such as the Olympic Lottery, Loto Canada and Superloto used pre-printed numbers on tickets. Lotto 6/49 led to the gradual phase-out of that type of lottery game in Canada.

Winning numbers are drawn by the Interprovincial Lottery Corporation (ILC) every Wednesday and Saturday, executed with a random number generator.

Gameplay
As of the September 14, 2022 draw, the game consists of two components:

 The "Classic Draw", in which six numbers are drawn from a set of 49. If a ticket matches all six numbers, a fixed prize of CA$5 million is won. A bonus number is also drawn, and if a player's ticket matches five numbers and the bonus number, the player wins the "second prize" which is usually between $100,000 and $500,000. Should more than one player win the top or second prize, it is split amongst them. Lesser prizes are also awarded if one matches at least two numbers. Until the September 14, 2022 draw, the top prize of this drawing was the main jackpot, which began at $5 million and increased each time it was not won.
 The "guaranteed prize draw", held since the September 18, 2013 draw, and known since September 2022 as the "Gold Ball Draw", which is a raffle prize of at least $1 million  that is awarded during each drawing. Some drawings (promoted as a "Superdraw") offer multiple secondary raffle prizes. 

Since the September 18, 2013 draw, a single line of six numbers costs $3. Each purchased line includes one entry into the guaranteed prize draw, identified by a ticket number; this number can only be matched exactly, and does not offer secondary prizes for matching partial digits.

Beginning with the September 14, 2022 draw, the "Gold Ball Draw" replaces what is now the "Classic Draw" as the means in which the main jackpot is awarded. As before, a guaranteed prize of $1 million is awarded during each draw. However, at least once every 30 draws, a larger jackpot will be randomly awarded to the Gold Ball Draw winner instead. The jackpot begins at $10 million, with a 1 in 30 chance that it will be awarded. If the jackpot is not awarded, the jackpot will increase by $2 million on the next drawing, and the probability of a jackpot win will improve.  These changes prevent the main jackpot from increasing without limit for an arbitrarily long time, or being split between multiple tickets.

Until May 2019, Lotto 6/49 and Lotto Max used a lottery machine to draw winning numbers. Since May 14, 2019, both games have switched to using a random number generator.

Largest jackpots
Before the June 2004 increase in ticket prices from $1 to $2, the largest Lotto 6/49 jackpot was $26.4 million, on September 2, 1995.

The largest Lotto 6/49 jackpot, was drawn on October 17, 2015 for a jackpot of $64 million. The jackpot was won by one ticket purchased in Mississauga, Ontario.

The second largest Lotto 6/49 jackpot, was $63.4 million on the draw for April 13, 2013. These were the two largest jackpots in Canadian history, until the jackpot of the Lotto Max was increased to a maximum of $70 million. This $70 million jackpot has been won numerous times in Ontario since it was introduced in May of 2019.

The third largest Lotto 6/49 jackpot was drawn on October 26, 2005. The single winning ticket, worth $54.3 million, was purchased in Camrose, Alberta by a group of 17 oil and gas plant workers. This was the largest Canadian lottery jackpot up to that time, and a significant increase from the previous record of $37.8 million on a Super 7 lottery draw in 2002—rapid sales created by lottery fever across the country pushed this 2005 Lotto 6/49 jackpot far beyond the originally estimated $40 million.

By comparison, while the Canadian Lotto Max lottery has had a main prize pool as high as $128 million, that lottery sets a cap of $70 million for its main jackpot, with excess "main prize pool" money being applied to a series of $1 million MaxMillions prizes on the same Pool.

Organization
The Lotto 6/49 game is administered by the Interprovincial Lottery Corporation, an alliance of the five regional lottery corporations in Canada.

Each of these corporations operate a regional add-on games that, for an extra $1 each, can be added to a 6/49 ticket. This "spiel" game (named "Tag", "Encore" or "Extra" depending on the region), adds a 6- or 7-digit number to the ticket with a top prize of $100,000 if all six digits are matched or $250,000 to $1,000,000 depending on the region for a seven-number match ($1,000,000 in Ontario and Quebec; $250,000 in the Western Canada region of Alberta, Saskatchewan, Manitoba and the territories).

Alongside the main Lotto 6/49 drawing, the regional corporations also run local versions of the game; Atlantic 49, Quebec 49, Ontario 49, Western 6/49, and BC 49. These draws are held on the same night as each Lotto 6/49 drawing, but with fixed jackpots of $2,000,000 (or $1,000,000 on Atlantic 49). Most of these regional games still use the prize structure used by the national game prior to September 18, 2013; Ontario 49 and Western 6/49 do use the current prize structure, adding a free play for matching two numbers. Most regional variants of 6/49 use only the Classic Draw format, although Atlantic 49 also offers a raffle prize of $25,649 on each drawing.

Prizes and chance of winning

Overall odds of winning a prize are about 1 in 6.6, though the great majority of prizes consist of a free ticket for the next draw (a break-even scenario at best, not a win in the strictest sense).

From the 2004 price change until September 18, 2013, this table was distributed thus:

Before July 2010, if there was no winning ticket for a jackpot of $30 million or higher, the following prize structure was applied to all subsequent draws until the jackpot was won. This did not apply to bonus jackpots.

The probability of winning some prize in one play is 1 in 32.3.

From the game's inception until the 2004 price change, the prize pool consisted of 45% of sales, and was distributed thus:

The overall odds of winning were 1 in 54.

See also
 Interprovincial Lottery Corporation
 Lotto Max
 Lotto Super 7
 Millionaire Life
 Ontario Lottery and Gaming Corporation

References

External links
 Atlantic Lottery
 British Columbia Lottery Corporation
 Loto-Québec
 Ontario Lottery and Gaming Corporation
 Western Canada Lottery Corporation

Lotteries in Canada
1982 establishments in Canada
Games and sports introduced in 1982